Filo or phyllo is a very thin unleavened dough used for making pastries such as baklava and börek in Middle Eastern and Balkan cuisines. Filo-based pastries are made by layering many sheets of filo brushed with oil or butter; the pastry is then baked.

Name and etymology

The name filo (phonetic) or phyllo (transliteration) comes from Greek  'leaf'. In Arabic, it is called ruqaq or ruqaqat"; in Morocco, warqa. In Turkish, it is called  'thin', a word which is also used for a kind of thin unleavened bread.Türk Dil Kurumu, Büyük Türkçe Sözlük search form  The Albanian flia also may be named for fije/fli 'sheet, leaf'.

History
The origin of the practice of stretching raw dough into paper-thin sheets is unclear, with many cultures claiming credit.

Some claim it may be derived from the Greeks; Homer's Odyssey, written around 800 BC, mentions thin breads sweetened with walnuts and honey. In the fifth century BC, Philoxenos states in his poem "Dinner" that, in the final drinking course of a meal, hosts would prepare and serve cheesecake made with milk and honey that was baked into a pie.

Others claim it originates with the Turks; the 11th-century Dīwān Lughāt al-Turk by Mahmud Kashgari records the meaning of yurgha, an archaic term for yufka, as "pleated or folded bread".  Filo is documented in the Topkapı Palace in the Ottoman period.

Preparation

Filo dough is made with flour, water and a small amount of oil. Homemade filo takes time and skill, requiring progressive rolling and stretching to a single thin and very large sheet. A very big table is used, preferably with a marble top. If the dough is stretched by hand, a long, thin rolling pin is used, with continual flouring between layers to prevent the sheets from sticking to one another. In modern times, mechanical rollers are also used. Prior to World War I, households in Istanbul typically had two filo makers to prepare razor thin sheets for baklava, and the relatively thicker sheets used for börek. Fresh and frozen versions are prepared for commercial markets.

Use

When using filo to make pastries, the thin layers are made by first rolling out the sheets of dough to the final thickness, then brushing them with oil, or melted butter for some desserts, and stacking them. This contrasts with puff pastry and croissant doughs, where the layers are stacked into a thick layer of dough, then folded and rolled out multiple times to produce a laminated dough containing thin layers of dough and fat.

Filo can be used in many ways: layered, folded, rolled, or ruffled, with various fillings.

 List of filo-based pastries 
 Baklava – Middle Eastern dessert with layers of filo with chopped nuts, sweetened and held together with syrup or honey.
 Banitsa – A Bulgarian dish consisting of eggs, cheese and filo baked in the oven.
 Börek – A savory Ottoman filo pie.
 Bougatsa – A type of Greek breakfast pastry.
 Bülbül yuvası – A Turkish dessert with pistachios and syrup.
 Bundevara – A Serbian sweet pie filled with pumpkin.
 Flia – An Albanian dish consisting of multiple crêpe-like layers brushed with cream and served with sour cream.
 Galaktoboureko – A Greek dessert consisting of filo and semolina custard.
 Gibanica – A Balkan dish made from filo, white cheese, and eggs.
 Pastizz – A savory pastry from Malta filled with ricotta or mushy peas.
 Spanakopita – A Greek spinach pie.
 Tiropita – A Greek dish similar to Börek, filled with a cheese-egg mixture.
 Zelnik – A savory pie from the Balkans.
 Jabukovača – Bosnian pastry made of filo dough stuffed with apples.

See also
Flaky pastry
Puff pastry
Brik
Samosa
Strudel
Wonton

References

Bibliography
 Perry, Charles. "The Taste for Layered Bread among the Nomadic Turks and the Central Asian Origins of Baklava", in A Taste of Thyme: Culinary Cultures of the Middle East (ed. Sami Zubaida, Richard Tapper), 1994. .
 Engin Akın, Mirsini Lambraki, Kosta Sarıoğlu, Aynı Sofrada İki Ülke: Türk ve Yunan Mutfağı'', Istanbul 2003, .

External links

Greek pastries
Middle Eastern cuisine
Balkan cuisine
Doughs
Turkish pastries